The 2016–17 Kia Picanto season was the third season of the franchise in the Philippine Basketball Association (PBA).

Key dates

2016

October 30: The 2016 PBA draft took place at Midtown Atrium, Robinson Place Manila.

Draft picks

Special draft

Regular draft

Roster

Philippine Cup

Eliminations

Standings

Game log

|- style="background:#fcc;"
| 1
| November 25
| GlobalPort
| L 75–97
| Alex Mallari (17)
| Alex Mallari (9)
| Alex Mallari (3)
| Smart Araneta Coliseum
| 0–1
|- style="background:#fcc;"
| 2
| November 30
| Rain or Shine
| L 83–105
| Escoto, Mallari, Paniamogan (10)
| Alex Mallari (10)
| Josan Nimes (2)
| Ynares Center
| 0–2

|- style="background:#fcc;"
| 3
| December 4
| Phoenix
| L 104–114
| Alex Mallari (19)
| Joseph Eriobu (10)
| four players (2)
| Smart Araneta Coliseum
| 0–3
|- style="background:#fcc;"
| 4
| December 11
| San Miguel
| L 91–94
| Alex Mallari (21)
| Alex Mallari (8)
| Mallari, Revilla (3)
| Smart Araneta Coliseum
| 0–4
|- style="background:#fcc;"
| 5
| December 16
| Barangay Ginebra
| L 70–89
| Mark Yee (15)
| Mark Yee (8)
| Mallari, Paniamogan, Revilla (4)
| Smart Araneta Coliseum
| 0–5
|- style="background:#cfc;"
| 6
| December 25
| Blackwater
| W 97–93 (OT)
| Alex Mallari (23)
| Mark Yee (14)
| Alex Mallari (4)
| Philippine Arena
| 1–5

|- style="background:#cfc;"
| 7
| January 11
| Meralco
| W 105–92
| Philip Paniamogan (25)
| Jason Ballesteros (8)
| Alex Mallari (11)
| Smart Araneta Coliseum
| 2–5
|- style="background:#fcc;"
| 8
| January 18
| TNT
| L 92–104
| Alex Mallari (19)
| Araña, Deutchman, Mallari (7)
| Alex Mallari (5)
| Cuneta Astrodome
| 2–6
|- style="background:#fcc;"
| 9
| January 22
| Alaska
| L 91–107
| Alex Mallari (23)
| Jason Ballesteros (6)
| Alex Mallari (8)
| PhilSports Arena
| 2–7
|- style="background:#cfc;"
| 10
| January 27
| NLEX
| W 106–96
| Alex Mallari (30)
| Ballesteros, Mallari (10)
| Alex Mallari (9)
| Cuneta Astrodome
| 3–7

|- style="background:#fcc;"
| 11
| February 1
| Star
| L 87–124
| Mallari, Salva (15)
| Jason Ballesteros (8)
| LA Revilla (7)
| Cuneta Astrodome
| 3–8

Commissioner's Cup

Eliminations

Standings

Game log

|- style="background:#fcc;"
| 1
| March 17
| Meralco
| L 86–94
| James White (33)
| James White (16)
| Alex Mallari (7)
| Smart Araneta Coliseum
| 0–1
|- style="background:#fcc;"
| 2
| March 19
| Rain or Shine
| L 95–99 (OT)
| James White (29)
| James White (21)
| Alex Mallari (6)
| Smart Araneta Coliseum
| 0–2
|- style="background:#cfc;"
| 3
| March 24
| NLEX
| W 89–81
| James White (30)
| James White (23)
| LA Revilla (5)
| Smart Araneta Coliseum
| 1–2
|- style="background:#fcc;"
| 4
| March 29
| Alaska
| L 92–98
| James White (30)
| James White (14)
| Celda, Mallari (4)
| Mall of Asia Arena
| 1–3

|- style="background:#fcc;"
| 5
| April 5
| Star
| L 83–97
| Alex Mallari (24)
| Keith Wright (14)
| Keith Wright (5)
| Smart Araneta Coliseum
| 1–4
|- style="background:#fcc;"
| 6
| April 9
| TNT
| L 84–86
| Keith Wright (26)
| Keith Wright (13)
| Keith Wright (4)
| Mall of Asia Arena
| 1–5
|- style="background:#fcc;"
| 7
| April 19
| San Miguel
| L 80–109
| Keith Wright (16)
| Keith Wright (12)
| LA Revilla (7)
| Cuneta Astrodome
| 1–6
|- style="background:#fcc;"
| 8
| April 23
| GlobalPort
| L 86–105
| Keith Wright (23)
| Keith Wright (9)
| LA Revilla (4)
| Smart Araneta Coliseum
| 1–7
|- align="center"
|colspan="9" bgcolor="#bbcaff"|All-Star Break

|- style="background:#cfc;"
| 9
| May 7
| Blackwater
| W 96–87
| Reden Celda (18)
| Keith Wright (16)
| Celda, Revilla (4)
| Smart Araneta Coliseum
| 2–7
|- style="background:#cfc;"
| 10
| May 21
| Phoenix
| W 122–121 (OT)
| LA Revilla (26)
| Keith Wright (21)
| LA Revilla (5)
| Mall of Asia Arena
| 3–7

|- style="background:#fcc;"
| 11
| June 2
| Barangay Ginebra
| L 80–94
| Keith Wright (21)
| Keith Wright (22)
| LA Revilla (5)
| Smart Araneta Coliseum
| 3–8

Governors' Cup

Eliminations

Standings

Game log

|- style="background:#fcc;"
| 1
| July 19
| Phoenix
| L 105–118
| Markeith Cummings (31)
| Markeith Cummings (10)
| Markeith Cummings (6)
| Smart Araneta Coliseum
| 0–1
|- style="background:#fcc;"
| 2
| July 22
| NLEX
| L 93–100
| Markeith Cummings (30)
| Markeith Cummings (15)
| Reden Celda (5)
| Mall of Asia Arena
| 0–2
|- style="background:#fcc;"
| 3
| July 28
| TNT
| L 96–106
| Markeith Cummings (27)
| Markeith Cummings (7)
| Nico Elorde (6)
| Ynares Center
| 0–3

|- style="background:#fcc;"
| 4
| August 2
| Barangay Ginebra
| L 99–120
| Reden Celda (21)
| Jason Ballesteros (10)
| LA Revilla (8)
| Smart Araneta Coliseum
| 0–4
|- style="background:#fcc;"
| 5
| August 6
| Meralco
| L 97–112
| Markeith Cummings (20)
| Markeith Cummings (7)
| LA Revilla (8)
| Smart Araneta Coliseum
| 0–5
|- style="background:#fcc;"
| 6
| August 13
| Rain or Shine
| L 86–94
| Markeith Cummings (30)
| Markeith Cummings (12)
| LA Revilla (7)
| Mall of Asia Arena
| 0–6
|- style="background:#fcc;"
| 7
| August 20
| GlobalPort
| L 90–102
| Markeith Cummings (37)
| Markeith Cummings (6)
| LA Revilla (5)
| Smart Araneta Coliseum
| 0–7

|- style="background:#fcc;"
| 8
| September 1
| Blackwater
| L 97–118
| Geron Johnson (28)
| Jackson Corpuz (10)
| Geron Johnson (6)
| Ynares Center
| 0–8
|- style="background:#fcc;"
| 9
| September 10
| Alaska
| L 94–102
| Geron Johnson (39)
| Geron Johnson (9)
| Geron Johnson (7)
| Smart Araneta Coliseum
| 0–9
|- style="background:#fcc;" 
| 10
| September 16
| San Miguel
| L 112–118
| Geron Johnson (42)
| Geron Johnson (10)
| Geron Johnson (8)
| Mall of Asia Arena 
| 0–10
|- style="background:#fcc;" 
| 11
| September 22
| Star
| L 81–128
| Geron Johnson (27)
| Corpuz, Johnson (9)
| Geron Johnson (5)
| Mall of Asia Arena 
| 0–11

Transactions

Trades

Off-season

Philippine

Free Agency

Subtraction

Recruited imports

Awards

References

Terrafirma Dyip seasons
Kia Picanto season